Cuckoo Patrol is a 1967 British musical comedy film directed by Duncan Wood and starring Freddie Garrity, Victor Maddern, John Le Mesurier and Kenneth Connor.  It was produced in 1965 but held back for two years.

The film's tag line, "Based on a story outline by Freddie and the Dreamers", has been described in The Independent as "terrifying".

Plot

A group of Boy Scouts get separated from Wick, their adult leader, on their way to a group meeting. A string of loosely-connected events ensue.

At first they are trapped in the back of a furniture lorry. When they eventually get out they are closer to their destination than they think, but thanks to poor map reading they head in the wrong direction.

A car passing loses a suitcase labelled The Silver Supermen. This results in them taking the place of two wrestlers in a tag match and surprisingly winning.

Struggling to establish camp, they are helped by a group of girl guides and end singing around the campfire until their leader Brown Owl takes the girls off. In fear of facing punishment, they pack up camp and leave.

Their handcart is in the middle of the road and two bank robbers have their car blocked. In suggesting a diversion the car is wrecked and they offer to carry the men's gear on their cart.  Soon after, they unknowingly help crack a safe at Marshall and Snodgress, a sports good store. The gelignite owned by the burglars gets thrown around before one boy opens the safe with a karate chop. They realise that a real crime is being committed after the bank-robbers threaten them with a gun and bombard the crooks with tennis balls before the police arrive.

The next morning they arrive safely at the group meeting on a tractor. The cart on the back blows up as the gelignite was still there. The boys laugh on the roof of the bus as Wick searches for them while holding a blade.

Cast
 Freddie Garrity as himself 
 Bernie Dwyer as himself 
 Derek Quinn as himself
 Pete Birrell as himself
 Roy Crewdson as himself 
 Kenneth Connor as Wick, scout leader
 John Le Mesurier as Gibbs, senior scout leader
 Victor Maddern as Dicko, bank robber
 Arthur Mullard as Yossle, bank robber
 Ernest Clark as Mr. Marshall 
 Basil Dignam as Mr. Snodgrass 
 Michael Brennan as Superman No.1 
 Neil McCarthy as Superman No.2 
 Peggy Ann Clifford as Brown Owl, Girl Guide leader
 Jack Lambert as Police Inspector
 Patsy Snell as Girl Guide
 Cheryl Molyneaux as Girl Guide
 Georgina Patterson as Girl Guide
 Sandra Hampton as Girl Guide
 Carmel Dene as Girl Guide
 Vic Wise as Moley
 Jo Gibbons as Jo
 Lou Marco as Referee
 Dominic Pye as Black Gorilla
 Bill Turney as Black Gorilla
 Roger Avon as Policeman
 Victor Platt as Van Driver
 Dan Cornwall as Van Driver
 Anthony Buckingham as Owly
 John Ross as Jumbo

References

1967 films
British musical comedy films
1967 musical comedy films
British black-and-white films
Films shot at MGM-British Studios
1960s English-language films
1960s British films